Beketovo is a rural locality (a settlement) in Kadnikovskoye Rural Settlement, Vozhegodsky District, Vologda Oblast, Russia. The population was 171 as of 2002. There are 5 streets.

Geography 
Beketovo is located 36 km west of Vozhega (the district's administrative centre) by road. Neklyudikha is the nearest rural locality.

References 

Rural localities in Vozhegodsky District